François Ndongo Mpessa (born 3 December 1978 in Douala) is a Cameroonian footballer, who is currently playing for Aigle Royal Menoua.

Career 
He playing during his career for South African side Manning Rangers, DPMM FC in Brunei, PSMS Medan in Indonesia and  TMFC in Malaysia.

International 
He earned his first and only cap in an friendly game in the year 1997.

Notes

1978 births
Cameroonian footballers
Association football defenders
Expatriate footballers in Malaysia
Cameroonian expatriate footballers
Expatriate footballers in Brunei
Cameroonian expatriate sportspeople in South Africa
Expatriate soccer players in South Africa
PSMS Medan players
Expatriate footballers in Indonesia
Cameroonian expatriate sportspeople in Indonesia
Association football midfielders
Cameroonian expatriate sportspeople in Malaysia
Footballers from Douala
Living people
DPMM FC players
Manning Rangers F.C. players
Cameroon international footballers